The 1972 Furman Paladins football team was an American football team that represented Furman University as a member of the Southern Conference (SoCon) during the 1972 NCAA University Division football season. In their 15th season under head coach Bob King, Furman compiled a 2–9 record, with a mark of 1–6 in conference play, placing seventh in the SoCon.

Schedule

References

Furman
Furman Paladins football seasons
Furman Paladins football